Hayward may refer to:

People
Hayward (surname), including a list of people with the name
Hayward (given name), including a list of people with the name

Places
Hayward, California, U.S., in Alameda County
Hayward station (Amtrak)
Hayward station (BART)
Hayward Executive Airport
Hayward Fault Zone, a geologic fault zone
Hayward, Mariposa County, California, U.S.
Hayward, Minnesota, U.S.
Hayward Township, Freeborn County, Minnesota, U.S.
Hayward, Missouri
Hayward, Oklahoma
Hayward, Oregon
Hayward, Wisconsin
Hayward (town), Wisconsin
Hayward station (British Columbia), Canada

Other uses
Hayward (profession), officer of an English parish in charge of fences and enclosures
Hayward Gallery, an art gallery in London, England
Actinidia deliciosa 'Hayward', a common cultivar of Kiwifruit

See also

Hayward High School (disambiguation)
Hayward station (disambiguation)
Haywards, a suburb near Wellington, New Zealand
Haywards (pickles)
Heyward, a given name and surname
Haywood (disambiguation)
Lake Hayward (disambiguation)
Haywards Heath, a town in West Sussex, England